Rodvínov is a municipality and village in Jindřichův Hradec District in the South Bohemian Region of the Czech Republic. It has about 600 inhabitants.

Administrative parts
The village of Jindřiš is an administrative part of Rodvínov.

References

Villages in Jindřichův Hradec District